John Whitfield may refer to:

John Whitfield (conductor) (1957–2019), British musician and conductor
John Whitfield (poet), Oxford Professor of Poetry
John Whitfield (politician) (born 1941), Conservative English Member of Parliament elected in 1983 for Dewsbury
John Clarke Whitfield (1770–1836), English organist and composer
John Wilkins Whitfield (1818–1879), U.S. House Delegate from Kansas Territory
John Yeldham Whitfield (1899–1971), British Army officer

See also
Jack Whitfield (1892–1927), Welsh rugby union player